FRG may refer to:
 Family Readiness Group in the United States Army
 Federal Republic of Germany
 West Germany
 FMN reductase (NAD(P)H)
 Friendship Radiosport Games
 Functional renormalization group
 Guatemalan Republican Front, a defunct political party in Guatemala
 Republic Airport in East Farmingdale, New York, United States